Captain Lord Charles William Brudenell-Bruce (18 June 1834 – 16 April 1897), styled Lord Charles Bruce, was a British soldier and Liberal Party politician. He served as Vice-Chamberlain of the Household under William Ewart Gladstone between 1880 and 1885.

Background
Bruce was the son of Charles Brudenell-Bruce, 1st Marquess of Ailesbury, by his second wife Maria Elizabeth Tollemache, daughter of the Honourable Charles Tollemache, of Harrington, Northamptonshire. George Brudenell-Bruce, 2nd Marquess of Ailesbury, and Ernest Brudenell-Bruce, 3rd Marquess of Ailesbury, were his elder half-brothers.

Military career
Bruce served in the 1st Life Guards. He purchased a captaincy in the regiment on 30 August 1859, succeeding Hon. Dudley FitzGerald-deRos. He was also an Honorary Major in the Royal Wiltshire Yeomanry.

Political career
Bruce sat as Member of Parliament for North Wiltshire from 1865 to 1874 and for Marlborough from 1878 to 1885. In 1880 he was sworn of the Privy Council and appointed Vice-Chamberlain of the Household under William Ewart Gladstone, a post he held until the Liberal government fell in 1885.

Family
Bruce married Augusta Georgiana Sophia Seymour, daughter of Frederick Charles William Seymour and granddaughter of Lord Hugh Seymour, on 2 February 1860. They had no children.
He died in April 1897, aged 62. Lady Charles Bruce died in February 1901.

References

External links
 

1834 births
1897 deaths
Liberal Party (UK) MPs for English constituencies
Members of the Privy Council of the United Kingdom
UK MPs 1865–1868
UK MPs 1868–1874
UK MPs 1874–1880
UK MPs 1880–1885
Younger sons of marquesses
Charles
Royal Wiltshire Yeomanry officers